The 2018 FC Dallas season will be the club's 23rd season in Major League Soccer, the top tier of American soccer. FC Dallas will also be participating in the CONCACAF Champions League, and the U.S. Open Cup.

Background

Transfers

In 

 

|}

Draft picks

Out

Club

Roster 
As of August 27, 2018.

Out on loan

Competitions

Preseason 
https://www.mlssoccer.com/post/2017/12/06/full-list-2018-mls-preseason-matches

MLS

Western Conference standings 
Western Conference

Overall standings

Results summary

Results by round

Regular season 
Kickoff times are in CDT (UTC-05) unless shown otherwise

MLS Cup Playoffs

Knockout Round

U.S. Open Cup

CONCACAF Champions League

Round of 16 

FC Dallas eliminated on away goals

Statistics

Appearances 

Numbers outside parentheses denote appearances as starter.
Numbers in parentheses denote appearances as substitute.
Players with no appearances are not included in the list.

 Goals and assists 

Player names in italics transferred out mid-season.

 Disciplinary record 

Player names in italics'' transferred out mid-season.

Goalkeeper stats

Kits

See also 
 FC Dallas
 2018 in American soccer
 2018 Major League Soccer season

References

Dallas, FC
Dallas, FC
Dallas, FC
FC Dallas seasons
Dallas, FC